Peregian Beach is a beach and small coastal town on the Sunshine Coast, Queensland, Australia. It is a suburb split between two local government areas with the eastern coastal in the Shire of Noosa and the western hinterland part in the Sunshine Coast Region. (Between 2008 and 2013 Peregian Beach was entirely within Sunshine Coast Region).

Geography
Peregian Beach within the Sunshine Coast Region comprises continual residential development along the eastern coastal strip of sandy beaches. The David Low Way passes north to south through this area. Development to the west is constrained by Noosa National Park.

Peregian Beach within the Shire of Noosa is further west, bounded on the north by Lake Weyba and to the east by Noosa National Park and Murdering Creek. Its south-western boundary roughly follows Emu Mountain Road. This area is only sparsely settled.

History
Peregian is a Kabi Kabi word for emu or may derive from perridhan/jan meaning mangrove seeds. Nearby Mount Peregian was formerly known as Emu Mountain.

During World War II,  Peregian Beach, Sunshine Beach and surrounding areas were used for artillery training. Current residents occasionally discover artillery shells and unexploded ordnance on their land.

Peregian Beach Community Primary School opened in 2002. It later expanded to offer secondary schooling and was renamed Peregian Beach Community College.

In 2015, there was a competition for local residents to choose one of four pieces of artwork to decorate the concrete walls of the Peregian Beach Reservoir. The winning artwork was "Peregian Stand" by Peregian artist Colin Passmore which depicted a stand of melaleuca trees.

In September 2019, Peregian Beach was significantly impacted by the fires in the Noosa region.

Education 
Peregian Beach Community College is a private primary and secondary (Prep-12) school at 41 Old Emu Mountain Road.

There are no government schools in Peregian Beach. The nearest government primary schools are Peregian Springs State School in neighbouring Peregian Springs to the south-west and Sunshine Beach State School in Sunshine Beach to the north. The nearest government secondary school is Coolum State High School in neighbouring Coolum Beach to the south.

Amenities
There is a village style shopping precinct, a surf club and hotel. The local skate park is popular amongst skaters in the region, but can be prone to short periods of flash flooding in the wet season.

The town of Peregian Beach has recently been given an upgrade, with a new shopping precinct including several new restaurants, a medical centre, and assorted shops. Several other shops have recently been renovated.

The Shire of Noosa operates a weekly mobile library service on a weekly schedule located on Woodland Drive.

Events
Peregian Originals is a popular community event held on the second Sunday of each month in the park beside the Surf Club showcasing original live music.

Peregian Markets is a popular community event held on the first and third Sunday of each month in the park on the beachside of the Surf Club which helps raise money for the local club.

References

Further reading

External links

 

Suburbs of Noosa Shire, Queensland
Suburbs of the Sunshine Coast Region
Towns in Queensland
Queensland in World War II
Coastline of Queensland